Butedale Falls is a high-volume waterfall located just north of the old ghost town of Butedale, British Columbia.  The entire section of stream between the outlet of Butedale Lake & the Inside Passage is one long series of cascades collectively known as Butedale Falls.  Butedale Lake is 315 feet above sea level and the falls base is the ocean so the falls' height is 315 feet.

References

External links
Youtube: Butedale Falls & Town from the Inside Passage

Waterfalls of British Columbia
Range 4 Coast Land District